= Morgan Yaping Wang =

Morgan Yaping Wang (born September 4, 1956) is an American entrepreneur, investor, and business leader. Wang is the Chairman of the Tsinghua University Alumni Private Equity Fund, a fund-of-funds supporting innovation and growth, as well as a Venture Partner at BHR (Bohai Harvest RST), a Sino-American private equity firm focused on cross-border investments and state-owned enterprise reform.

== Early life and education ==
Wang was born in Beijing, China, in 1956.

Wang holds an MFA in Motion Picture and Television from University of California, Los Angeles, and pursued advanced studies at Tsinghua University, Columbia University, and Peking University.

== Career ==
Wang has experience spanning private equity, real estate, hospitality, technology, energy, semiconductor design, and the creative industries. Since 1997, he has also served as the Chairman of XJ Grand Hotel LLC, guiding international commercial and residential development projects.

In recognition of his expertise, President George W. Bush appointed Morgan in 2002 to serve on the Advisory Committee for Trade Policy and Negotiations (ACTPN), where he joined a select group of US business leaders to advise the US Trade Representative on international trade policy.

He is also the founder of Many Worlds Entertainment (LLC).

== Personal life ==
Wang lives in Los Angeles with his wife. He's also the father of three children.
